Jiali District is a district located in northern Tainan, Taiwan, about 15 km north of the former Dutch base of Fort Zeelandia.

History 
In the 17th century, the place was named Soulang after one of the four subtribes of the local Siraya aborigines. It later became the Chinese market-town called Siau-lang.

Republic of China
After the handover of Taiwan from Japan to the Republic of China in 1945, Jiali was organized as an urban township of Tainan County. On 25 December 2010, Tainan County was merged with Tainan City and Jiali was upgraded to a district of the city.

Administrative divisions 
The district consists of Tungning, Zhongren, Zhenshan, Jiannan, Anxi, Liuan, Jiahua, Haideng, Minan, Zilong, Yingxi, Wenxin, Jiaxing, Xiaying, Wennei and Nanshi Village.

Education 
 National Pei Men Senior High School
 National Pei-men Senior Agricultural and Industrial Vocational School, PMAI

Tourist attractions 

 Soulangh Cultural Park
 Jintang Temple
 Zhengxing Temple
 Beitouyang Cultural Park

Transportation 

 Jiali Bus Station

Notable natives 
 Chen Li-chen, Mayor of Chiayi City (2000–2005)
 Wei Yao-chien, member of Legislative Yuan (1990–1996)
 Wu Yao-ting, businessperson

References

External links 

 

Districts of Tainan